The North East Futsal League is a mixed-gender futsal league in India. The first tournament was held from 25 to 31 August 2019 in Karmbir Nabin Chandra Bordoloi Indoor Stadium, Guwahati, Assam. Six teams from different states competed in the inaugural season.

Teams

Foreign players

References 

Futsal in India
Futsal leagues in Asia
Sports leagues established in 2019
2019 establishments in India